is a Japanese former marathon runner. Born in Fukuoka Prefecture, she was a two-time winner at the Tokyo International Women's Marathon, winner of the Australia's Gold Coast Marathon in 1992 and won the Paris Marathon in 1994.

Tanigawa also competed in half marathon races: she won individual and team silver medals at the 1993 IAAF World Half Marathon Championships and won the 1994 Sapporo Half Marathon and 1996 America's Finest City Half Marathon. She was a team bronze medalist at the 1994 IAAF World Half Marathon Championships, where she finished tenth.

She had career personal bests of 2:27:55 hours for the marathon and 1:09:37 hours for the half marathon.

She is the organizer of several popular races in Japan, the Mari Tanigawa Half Marathon and the Mari Tanigawa Ekiden.

Achievements
All results regarding marathon, unless stated otherwise

References

External links
Official website

1962 births
Living people
Sportspeople from Fukuoka Prefecture
Japanese female long-distance runners
Japanese female marathon runners
Japan Championships in Athletics winners
Paris Marathon female winners
20th-century Japanese women
21st-century Japanese women